Gúna Nua Theatre Company is an independent theatre production company based in Dublin, Ireland. Founded in 1998 by Paul Meade and David Parnell, it is grant-aided in Ireland by the Arts Council and by Dublin City Council.

Production history

World premieres
The Morning After The Life Before - written by Ann Blake. First performed in the Belltable Arts Centre, Limerick.
Meltdown by Paul Meade (co-production with axis:Ballymun) – Presented at axis:Ballymun and Project Arts Centre as part of Absolut Fringe, 2009.  Also presented at Civic Theatre Tallaght.
Little Gem by Elaine Murphy (co-production with Civic Theatre) – Winner Carol Tambor Best of Edinburgh Award, Winner BBC/Stewart Parker Award, Winner Fishamble New Writing Award and Best Female Performer Award (entire cast as ensemble), 2008.
Unravelling the Ribbon by Mary Kelly and Maureen White (co-production with Plan B Productions). Presented in association with Action Breast Cancer, proudly sponsored by Avon Breast Cancer Crusade. Project Cube 2007.
Trousers by Paul Meade and David Parnell (co-production with Civic Theatre Tallaght
Thesis by Gerry Dukes, Paul Meade and David Parnell (co-production with Civic Theatre)
Skin Deep by Paul Meade - Stewart Parker award for Best New Play and nominated for two Irish Times/ESB theatre awards. Project Arts Centre 2003.
Taste by David Parnell Andrew's Lane 2002.
Scenes From a Water Cooler by Paul Meade and David Parnell – Winner, Dublin Fringe Awards, Best Production and Best Actor (David Pearse).
Four Storeys by David Parnell. Project@themint 1998.

Irish premieres
Dinner With Friends by Donald Margulies (co-production with Lane Productions) – Irish Times/ESB theatre awards nomination, best set design, Ferdia Murphy.  Andrews Lane 2004.
The Real Thing (in association with Andrew's Lane Theatre) by Tom Stoppard. Andrews Lane 2004.

References

External links
 Gúna Nua website

Theatre companies in the Republic of Ireland
Companies based in Dublin (city)